John Joseph Blum (born September 8, 1959) is an American former professional ice hockey defenseman. He played in the National Hockey League with the Edmonton Oilers, Boston Bruins, Washington Capitals, and Detroit Red Wings between 1982 and 1990. He also spent considerable time in the minor American Hockey League, and retired in 1995.

Playing career
Blum was born in Detroit, Michigan. He is a graduate of Notre Dame High School in Harper Woods, Michigan.  His high school hockey teammates were comedian Dave Coulier and other well known players and personalities.  Blum played both high school and college hockey under head coach John Giordano.

Signed as an undrafted free agent by the Edmonton Oilers in 1981, Blum played mostly in the minors before being traded to the Boston Bruins, a team that he would play for three different times during his career. He also played for the Washington Capitals and Detroit Red Wings.

Blum scored in first NHL goal on April 1, 1984—in the last game of Boston's 1983-84 schedule—during his team's 3-1 victory over the New Jersey Devils.  It was the game-winning goal.

Post-playing career
Blum would later serve as an assistant coach in the minor leagues for the Detroit Falcons, Saginaw Lumber Kings, Detroit Vipers, Toledo Storm, and Motor City Mechanics.

He is also a new addition to the Detroit Red Wings Alumni Team and a former employee at De La Salle Collegiate High School in Warren, MI.

Career statistics

Regular season and playoffs

Awards and honors

References

External links

1959 births
Living people
Adirondack Red Wings players
American men's ice hockey defensemen
Boston Bruins players
Capital District Islanders players
Detroit Falcons (CoHL) players
Detroit Red Wings players
Edmonton Oilers players
Ice hockey people from Detroit
Maine Mariners players
Michigan Wolverines men's ice hockey players
Moncton Alpines (AHL) players
Moncton Golden Flames players
Undrafted National Hockey League players
Washington Capitals players
Wichita Wind players